Praonethomimus tuberosithorax is a species of beetle in the family Cerambycidae, and the only species in the genus Praonethomimus. It was described by Stephan von Breuning in 1939.

It's 6⅓–9 mm long and 2⅓–3 mm wide, and its type locality is "Pyonchaung Res., N. Toungoo", Myanmar.

References

Apomecynini
Beetles described in 1939
Taxa named by Stephan von Breuning (entomologist)
Monotypic beetle genera